Isesjøen is a lake in the municipality of Sarpsborg in Østfold county, Norway.

See also
List of lakes in Norway

Sarpsborg
Lakes of Viken (county)